Sir Harry Munro, 7th Baronet (c. 1720 – 12 June 1781) was 25th Baron and the 28th chief of the Clan Munro. He was a Scottish soldier and politician. He was loyal to the Hanoverian dynasty and served as a captain in Loudon's Highlanders Regiment 1745–48.

Early life

Harry Munro was the second surviving son of Sir Robert Munro, 6th Baronet and Mary, daughter of Henry Seymour of Woodlands. His elder brother Robert died during his infancy. His uncle was George Munro, 1st of Culcairn.

Early military career

Sir Harry's military career seems to have started when he was among nine young gentlemen, who were appointed Ensigns in Bisset's  30th Regiment of Foot in May 1742. In June 1745 he was appointed on the recommendation of Lord Stair and Henry Pelham as one of the company commanders in a new Highland Regiment being raised by John Campbell, 4th Earl of Loudoun.

Jacobite rising of 1745 - 1746

Harry Munro's company was one of three in the process of being raised in the North when the Commander in Chief in Scotland, General Sir John Cope arrived at Inverness on 29 August. Harry's uncle George Munro, 1st of Culcairn met Sir John Cope and agreed that the Munros "should instantly take arms and join the King's troops" and the next day Harry brought in 200 of his men in three companies. These three companies were raised by Harry Munro himself, Hugh Munro of Teaninich and William Munro of Achany.

Harry joined Sir John Cope at the Water of Nairn and when the army marched for Aberdeen on 4 September Loudon's Highlanders regiment included his three companies, while George Munro of Culcairn's detachment acted as scouts. Sir John Cope remained in Aberdeen where a fourth company of Loudoun's regiment joined the others until 14 September from where they sailed to Dunbar and had their infamous defeat at the Battle of Prestonpans. Harry was among 70 officers taken prisoner and for a time was imprisoned in Glamis Castle but by mid January 1746 he was among 31 men released who arrived at Edinburgh, where he learnt the news of the deaths of his father Robert and his uncle Duncan after the Battle of Falkirk (1746).

Meanwhile, the main body of Munros having escorted Sir John Cope successfully to Aberdeen had returned to the north under George Munro, 1st of Culcairn and were not present at Prestonpans.

John Campbell, 4th Earl of Loudoun and Sir John Cope had escaped by sea to London after the Battle of Prestonpans from whence Loudoun later returned north to Inverness to take command in the north but was forced with the Lord President Forbes and George Munro of Culcairn to withdraw through the Black Isle into Ross-shire being pressed by a much larger Jacobite force.

The commander of British forces, Prince William, Duke of Cumberland, had no wish to have the support of any Highland troops at the time for he distrusted them all and deliberately gave the Earl of Loudoun no help to extricate himself from his difficulties with the Jacobites in the north. Harry Munro was with George Mackay of Skibo, son of George Mackay, 3rd Lord Reay, at the Skirmish of Tongue in March 1746 where they defeated a Jacobite force and captured money and supplies that were meant for the Jacobite leader Charles Edward Stuart.

Three other companies of Loudoun's regiment raised in Argyll from the Clan Campbell came under the Duke of Cumberland's command in his march north from Stirling but they were used mainly as scouts and baggage guards. However, several of them, including one officer were killed when they fought at the Battle of Culloden. Loudon's Highlanders Regiment was at Culloden but Harry Munro himself was listed as absent "by HRH leave" presumably to try to deal with the problems at Foulis Castle which had been burned after the Battle of Falkirk.

At the request of Simon Fraser, 11th Lord Lovat, Harry Munro of Foulis and Ludovick Grant of Grant visited Lovat while he was imprisoned in the Tower of London having received the death sentence.

After the suppression of the rebellion, Loudon's Highlanders later took part in the mopping up operations based at Fort Augustus. The regiment remained in Scotland until May 1747 when they embarked at Bruntisland to join the allied army under Cumberland in Flanders.

The Munro company under Harry appears to have stayed in Scotland but in a letter from another officer in March 1748, Sir Harry is said to be going over to join the regiment. However, with the ending of the war in Flanders, Loudon's regiment was ordered back to Scotland and reduced at Perth in June of that year.

Member of Parliament

In politics Harry Munro was a supporter of the Duke of Newcastle, a prominent Whig who was Prime Minister 1754 - 1756 and 1757 - 1762. Harry Munro also served as MP for Ross-shire 11 December 1746 - 1747 and for Tain Burghs 1747 - 1761.

Family

Harry married Anne, daughter of Hugh Rose of Kilravock, chief of the Clan Rose. Harry was succeeded by his son Sir Hugh Munro, 8th Baronet of Foulis.

He is buried in Greyfriars Kirkyard in the centre of Edinburgh. The grave lies on the north side of a vault in an obscured location north-west of the Adam mausoleum.

Independent Highland Company

The Independent Highland Companies that were raised by Lord Loudoun in 1745-46 were not regimented until 1747 and therefore they are often confused with the eighteen Independent Highland Companies that were raised by Duncan Forbes of Culloden. The Loudoun Papers are held in the Huntington Library in San Marino, California and include four lists of the soldiers under Sir Harry Munro in the company raised for Lord Loudoun dated September 17, 1746, November 18, 1746, January 12, 1748 and January 16, 1748. The first of these being five months after the Jacobite rising was effectively ended at the Battle of Culloden in April 1746, and Sir Harry Munro's three companies having been reduced to just one company. The following two lists are the soldiers who were in Sir Harry Munro's company on September 17, 1746, and on November 18, 1746.
List of soldiers in Sir Harry Munro's company on September 17, 1746

List of soldiers in Sir Harry Munro's company on November 18, 1746

Sources

See also

Munro Baronets
Clan Munro
Scottish clan

1720 births
1781 deaths
Baronets in the Baronetage of Nova Scotia
30th Regiment of Foot officers
Members of the Parliament of Great Britain for Scottish constituencies
Harry Munro, 7th Baronet of Foulis
British Army personnel of the Jacobite rising of 1745
British MPs 1741–1747
British MPs 1747–1754
British MPs 1754–1761
Burials at Greyfriars Kirkyard